The Day I Died: Unclosed Case is a 2020 South Korean character driven, investigation drama film, directed by Park Ji-wan in her directorial debut. The film starring Kim Hye-soo, Lee Jung-eun, Roh Jeong-eui and Kim Sun-young, is a mysterious story and about a missing girl supposedly died from a cliff on a dark stormy night. The film was released in theaters on November 12, 2020.

Synopsis

Se-jin (Roh Jeong-eui) disappears on a dark and stormy night, leaving only her shoes and her last will behind on a cliff. Kim Hyeon-soo (Kim Hye-soo) is assigned to investigate the case, but due to bad weather, the body of Se-jin can not been found and the case remains open. Se-jin's death is simply dismissed as a suicide by local detectives. Hyeon-soo has to find the truth behind the suspicious disappearance of the teenage girl.

Cast
 Kim Hye-soo as Kim Hyeon-soo
 Lee Jung-eun as Suncheondaek
 Roh Jeong-eui as Se-jin
 Kim Sun-young Min-jeong
 Lee Sang-yeob as Hyeong-joon 
 Moon Jung-hee as Jeong-mi
 Yoon Byung-hee
 Park Ji-hoon as Yong-jin
 Oh Se-young as Bakery shop clerk
 Kim Jung-young as Superior

Production
Kim Hye-soo was confirmed to appear in June 2019.
In August 2019, Lee Sang-yeop was cast in the film. The film was wrapped up in November, 2019. The distribution press conference was held on November 4, 2020, setting the way to release of the film.

Release

The film was invited at 25th Bucheon International Fantastic Film Festival held in July, 2021 to compete in Bucheon Choice Features section. It was also invited at 23rd Seoul International Women's Film Festival in New Wave section and was screened on August 28, 2021.

Reception

Box office
The film released on November 12, 2020 on 909 screens.

As of February 2, 2021, the film is at 25th place, with gross of US$1.91 million and 233,112 admissions, among all the Korean films released in the year 2020.

Critical response

Going by Korean review aggregator Naver Movie Database, the film holds an approval rating of 9.07 from the audience.

Awards and nominations

References

External links
 
 
 
 

2020s Korean-language films
2020 films
South Korean mystery drama films
Warner Bros. films
2020 directorial debut films
2020 drama films